Angora (also Antelope Hill) is an unincorporated community in northern Morrill County, Nebraska, United States. It lies along U.S. Route 385, north of the city of Bridgeport, the county seat of Morrill County.  The community was established in 1900 by the Chicago, Burlington, and Quincy Railroad; it was named for the Turkish city of Ankara, which was then known as Angora. The Angora post office was established in 1901, and it remains open with the assigned ZIP code of 69331.

Climate
According to the Köppen climate classification, Angora has a semiarid climate, BSk on climate maps.

References

Unincorporated communities in Morrill County, Nebraska
Unincorporated communities in Nebraska